Geri Reig is the debut studio album by German band Der Plan, released in 1980 by record labels Warning and Ata Tak.

Critical reception 

AllMusic wrote: "Pop music has never sounded stranger than on Der Plan's debut full-length, Geri Reig, a unique blend of Residents-inspired experimental pop and innovative electronics. A cohesive and endlessly listenable record, it creates a sense of detachment and mystery found in all the best records of the new wave era".

Track listing
"Adrenalin Lässt Das Blut Kochen" 3:10
"Geri Regi" 2:35
"Persisches Cowboy-Golf" 1:18
"Gefährliche Clowns" 3:18
"Kleine Grabesstille" 1:04
"Der Weltaufstandsplan" 2:43
"Hans Und Gabi" 3:10
"Commerce Extérieur Mondial Sentimental" 2:39
"Was Ich Von Mir Denke"	3:38
"San José Car Muzak" 2:56
"Erste Begegnung Mit Dem Tod" 0:51
"Ich Bin Schizophren" 2:39
"Nessie"	1:29
Gefährliche Clowns (Manisch Idiotisch)" 4:57
"Die Welt Ist Schlecht" 1:52

References

External links 

 
 The Wire article on a song from the album

1980 debut albums
Experimental pop albums
Electronic albums by German artists